The Boeing XP-4 was a prototype American biplane fighter of the 1920s. It was grounded permanently after just 4.5 hours of flight testing.

Development and design
In 1926, the United States Army was very interested in the turbo-supercharger as a way of improving engine performance, and requested that one be added to the last of the PW-9s, and the engine upgraded to a 510 hp Packard 1A-1500. This machine was designated XP-4.

In addition, the basic PW-9 armament of one .50 and one .30 cal. machine guns in the nose was supplemented by two added .30 cal. guns mounted under the lower wing, far enough out to be outside the propeller arc (thus not needing synchronization).

All these modifications added weight, so the lower wing span was extended by 9.5 feet.

The airplane was delivered to Wright Field for testing on 27 July 1927, but it quickly became apparent that the Packard engine did not have sufficient power to compensate for the 800 lbs of extra weight, the craft performing more poorly than its predecessor, and the project was quickly abandoned.

Specifications (XP-4)

See also

References

Notes

Bibliography

 Angelucci, Enzo. The American Fighter from 1917 to the present. New York: Orion Books, 1987. . 
 Dorr, Robert F. and David Donald. Fighters of the United States Air Force. London: Temple, 1990. .
 Jones, Lloyd S. U.S. Fighters: Army-Air Force 1925 to 1980s.. Fallbrook, California: Aero Publishers, Inc., 1975. .

External links
 Joe Baugher page on the XP-4 
 USAF Museum page, with pictures

Boeing P-04
P-04
Single-engined tractor aircraft
Biplanes